Miguel Ferreira de Almeida (born 20 September 1949) is a Brazilian footballer who played as a defender. He competed in the men's tournament at the 1968 Summer Olympics.

References

1949 births
Living people
Footballers from Rio de Janeiro (city)
Brazilian footballers
Association football defenders
Brazil international footballers
Olympic footballers of Brazil
Footballers at the 1968 Summer Olympics